The Foreign Player of the Year in Romania is an association football award presented to players in Romania, which recognises the most outstanding foreign player in the country each calendar year. It was started in 2008 by Gazeta Sporturilor, a daily sports newspaper, and the winner is usually announced at the end of December.

Other annual honours handed out by Gazeta Sporturilor include the Romanian Footballer of the Year and the Romania Coach of the Year awards.

Winners

Breakdown of winners

By number of wins

By country

By club

See also
Gazeta Sporturilor Romanian Footballer of the Year
Gazeta Sporturilor Romania Coach of the Year
Gazeta Sporturilor Monthly Football Awards

References
Notes

Citations

External links
Gazeta Sporturilor official website 

 
Awards established in 2008
 
Romanian football trophies and awards
Association football player non-biographical articles